Robert William McQuarters, II (born December 21, 1976) is a former American football cornerback. He was drafted by the San Francisco 49ers in the first round of the 1998 NFL Draft. He played college football at Oklahoma State.

College career
McQuarters was known as one of the most versatile players in college football during his time at Oklahoma State, playing defensive back, wide receiver, and kick returner. He started nine games at wide receiver as a junior and finished his college career with eight receptions for 245 yards (30.6 avg.) and two touchdowns. He rushed for 69 yards on two carries and one touchdown. He ranked second in the nation and set a school record with 521 punt return yards for a 16.3-yard average and one touchdown and added 195 yards on eight kickoff returns for an average of 24.4 yards per attempt.

McQuarters played Oklahoma State Cowboys basketball for three years. Prior to attending OSU, McQuarters played basketball at Booker T. Washington High School in Tulsa. McQuarters played for coach Nate Harris who, in 1996, coached the West Team in the McDonald's High School All-American Game.

Professional career
He is a favorite of former Detroit Lions coach Steve Mariucci, who drafted him when Mariucci was head coach of the 49ers, then signed him as a free agent with the Lions.

As a member of the New York Giants, McQuarters had a key interception in a 2007 NFC divisional playoff game against the Dallas Cowboys that sealed New York's victory.  McQuarters earned a Super Bowl ring with the Giants in Super Bowl XLII beating the New England Patriots.

Legal history
In October 2006, a Chicago judge dismissed McQuarters's claims that a bank wrongfully declared him in default on $1.3 million in loans. McQuarters claimed in a countersuit that the bank's representatives had violated consumer fraud acts and its employees had forged his signature on bank documents. The judge ordered him to pay the bank's legal fees of about $20,000.

Personal life
McQuarters was known for his long dreadlocks which he cut in 2007 after growing them out starting in 1998. McQuarters donated the hair to Locks of Love. McQuarters is known for wearing a variety of band-aids under one or both eyes, including those depicting the  Nickelodeon character SpongeBob SquarePants.

On April 29, 2011, McQuarters was shot once in the back as he departed a friend's house in Tulsa. McQuarters was not seriously hurt, and was able to drive himself to the hospital. He described the gunman as a man wearing a ski mask.

References

External links
College Football Stats
College Basketball Stats

1976 births
Living people
Sportspeople from Tulsa, Oklahoma
African-American players of American football
American football cornerbacks
American shooting survivors
Booker T. Washington High School (Tulsa, Oklahoma) alumni
Oklahoma State Cowboys football players
Oklahoma State Cowboys basketball players
San Francisco 49ers players
Chicago Bears players
Detroit Lions players
New York Giants players
Players of American football from Oklahoma
American men's basketball players
21st-century African-American sportspeople
20th-century African-American sportspeople